YPU may refer to:

 Puntzi Mountain Airport, IATA airport code 
 Yale Political Union, debate society